Tuckneraria is a genus of lichen-forming fungi in the family Parmeliaceae.

Taxonomy
The genus was circumscribed in Acta Bot. Fenn. vol.150 on pages 143-151 in 1994 by Tiina Randlane and Arne Thell.

The genus name honours Edward Tuckerman (1817–1886), who was an American botanist and professor who made significant contributions to the study of lichens and other alpine plants. He was a founding member of the Natural History Society of Boston and most of his career was spent at Amherst College.
Tuckermannopsis, Nephromopsis combined with Cetraria.

Species
As accepted by Species Fungorum;
 Tuckneraria laureri 
 Tuckneraria laxa 
 Tuckneraria pseudocomplicata 

Former species;
 T. ahtii  = Nephromopsis ahtii
 T. sikkimensis  = Nephromopsis sikkimensis
 T. togashii  = Nephromopsis togashii

References

Parmeliaceae
Lichen genera
Lecanorales genera
Taxa described in 1994